Richard Banks may refer to:

 Richard C. Banks (born 1931), American zoologist
 Richard E. Banks (1794–1856), American physician and surgeon
 Billy Williams (music hall performer) (Richard Isaac Banks, 1878–1915), Australian musician
 Richard Banks (banker) (born 1952), British banker

See also 
 Ralph Richard Banks (born 1964), professor at Stanford Law School
 Richard Banke ( 1410), English judge